Gananoque Airport  is located  northwest of the town of Gananoque, Ontario, Canada, in Canada's busy Quebec City-Windsor Corridor. It is currently a major centre for skydiving, as well as one of the three Canadian airports serving the Thousand Islands (along with Kingston/Norman Rogers Airport and Brockville Regional Tackaberry Airport).

History
The Gananoque Airport was a relief landing field for RCAF Station Kingston (now Kingston/Norman Rogers Airport) during World War II, and with Kingston, participated in the British Commonwealth Air Training Plan. The field preserves the original, classic BCATP triangular runway arrangement along with some of the original wartime structures.

Since 1971, the airport has been utilized as a sports skydiving dropzone with jumps available to the general public.

See also
 Gananoque Water Aerodrome
 RCAF Detachment Gananoque

References

External links
 Page about this airport  on COPA's Places to Fly airport directory
 Skydive Gananoque

Registered aerodromes in Ontario
Airports of the British Commonwealth Air Training Plan